Pawa is one of the 51 union councils of Abbottabad District in the Khyber Pakhtunkhwa province of Pakistan.

Location 

The union council of Pawa is situated in the North West of the district (and to the north west of Abbottabad city) towards Mansehra District. Neighbouring union councils are Kothiala to the south and [UC Jhangi] to the East. Pawa town has an average elevation of 1350 metres (4432 feet).

Tibes 
 Tanoli
Sulaimankhel
 Qureshi
 Syed
 Turks
Mughals
Gujjar
Awans

Subdivisions
Bandi phullan
Gandhian
Bandian
Sohlna
Kakot
Shahkot
Pawa
Kumar bandi
Richbehn
Pando thana

References 

Union councils of Abbottabad District

fr:Pawa (Pakistan)